The Gresham Library, also known as the Gresham Regional Library, is a branch of the Multnomah County Library in Gresham in the U.S. state of Oregon. The branch offers the Multnomah County Library catalog of two million books, periodicals and other materials.

History
The building occupied by the library was constructed in 1989 and opened in January 1990. It replaced a 1913 Tudor style building at 410 N. Main Street, which had been a Carnegie library. The new building was paid for by a $2.1 million fund-raising campaign designed in part by then-Governor Neil Goldschmidt, including $1.7 million serial levy approved by Multnomah County voters in 1987 and a projected $200,000 from the sale of the original building. Following the levy, three attempts to buy suitable property that could be developed within the $1.7 million approved had failed by mid-1988, leading to the consideration of several more expensive options.

The new building is 13 times the size of the original library, and was designed as a "superbranch" to "usher in a new era in library services in both Gresham and the entire county system." Upgrades included a computer lab/media center, a community room, a teen study area, a children's room, a conference room, skylights, and a tower to help it blend in with the surrounding shopping center.

With space for 75,000 volumes, the  library building was designed as the Multnomah County system's second-largest, behind Portland's Central Library. The original library building was purchased by the Gresham Historical Society, which turned it into a museum as well as housing its main headquarters there.

References

1989 establishments in Oregon
Buildings and structures in Gresham, Oregon
Library buildings completed in 1989
Multnomah County Library